Shadow and Bone is an American fantasy streaming television series developed by Eric Heisserer for Netflix. It is based on two series of books in the Grishaverse by Leigh Bardugo, the Shadow and Bone trilogy and the Six of Crows duology. All eight episodes of the first season premiered on April 23, 2021. In June 2021, the series was renewed for a second season, also consisting of eight episodes which premiered on March 16, 2023.

The series adapts the story of young Alina Starkov, an orphan and cartographer of the Ravka nation's First Army, as she discovers she is a Grisha, one with special gifts, and one long awaited to address a dire need in the universe. The first season adapts Shadow and Bone (2012), and adds an original storyline featuring the Crows, a criminal gang for which the eponymous duology is named. The second season adapts Siege and Storm (2013) and Ruin and Rising (2014), along with elements of Crooked Kingdom (2016) in the Crows' storyline.

Premise and world 
The Grisha universe consists of the nations of Ravka, Fjerda, Shu Han, Kerch, Novyi Zem, and the Wandering Isle. Each adapts elements of language, culture and tradition from countries of the real world (drawn from different real time periods). Grisha are a people who have been described as "magic-users" but in their words, they are practitioners of "The Small Science" which reflects an individual gift each holds to manipulate matter at its smallest level, the "molecular level".

Ravka is home to most of the Grisha as they are "usually discovered as children by traveling Grisha testers and brought to... [train in that nation's] Second Army". It is one of few places they can live safely, and, when training for the Second Army, they are divided into three orders:

Etherealki summon natural elements such as wind, water and fire;
Materialki control materials such as metal and glass; and,
Corporalki manipulate people's bodies. 

Ravka's Second Army is led by General Kirigan, also known as the Darkling, who has spent his life searching for a Grisha who can summon light, the only person who could destroy the Shadow Fold (or "the Fold")—a region of engulfing darkness created hundreds of years ago that divides Ravka in two, the east from the west. Since then, Ravka has been at war and is now on the brink of splitting in two as the west seeks independence.

Alina Starkov turns out to be such a Grisha, and word spreads that a Sun Summoner has been found. In the Kerch capital and trading city of Ketterdam, Kaz Brekker, leader of a gang called the Crows, is hired to kidnap her; Fjerdan witch hunters are sent to kill her; the people of Ravka venerate her as a Saint. Alina must come to terms with who she is and decide whom she can truly trust as she searches for the power that will allow her to destroy the Fold and save Ravka.

Cast and characters

Main
 Jessie Mei Li as Alina Starkov, an orphan and former assistant cartographer of the Royal Corps of Surveyors in the First Army. She discovers she is the Sun Summoner, a rare Grisha with the ability to control light. Alina was reimagined as half-Shu (having had one parent from Shu-Han) in the series.
 Kaylan Teague as Young Alina
 Archie Renaux as Malyen "Mal" Oretsev, an orphan tracker in the First Army and Alina's childhood best friend
 Cody Molko as Young Mal
 Freddy Carter as Kaz Brekker, leader of the Crows, known as Dirtyhands and the Bastard of the Barrel
 Amita Suman as Inej Ghafa, member of the Crows, known as the Wraith
 Kit Young as Jesper Fahey, member of the Crows, a skilled sharpshooter
 Ben Barnes as General Aleksander Kirigan / The Darkling, general of the Second Army and the Shadow Summoner
 Zoë Wanamaker as Baghra, Alina's Grisha trainer and Aleksander's mother
 Patrick Gibson as Nikolai Lantsov (season 2), a privateer and Prince of Ravka
 Daisy Head as Genya Safin (season 2; recurring season 1), the only known Grisha Tailor, who befriends Alina
 Danielle Galligan as Nina Zenik (season 2; recurring season 1), a Heartrender, who is taken captive by Fjerdans
 Calahan Skogman as Matthias (season 2; recurring season 1), a Fjerdan Drüskelle (witch-hunter), who takes part in Nina's capture
 Lewis Tan as Tolya Yul-Bataar (season 2)
 Jack Wolfe as Wylan Hendriks (season 2), an alchemist who reluctantly becomes the Crows' demolitions expert
 Anna Leong Brophy as Tamar Kir-Bataar (season 2)

Recurring

 Dean Lennox Kelly as Pekka Rollins, the ruthless leader of Dime Lions gang in Ketterdam and Kaz's foe
 Sujaya Dasgupta as Zoya, a Squaller (wind Summoner), who is interested in Mal and who is jealous of Alina
 Simon Sears as Ivan, a Heartrender, who serves under Gen. Kirigan
 Howard Charles as Arken, the Conductor, who smuggles people across the Fold
 Julian Kostov as Fedyor, a Heartrender, who serves under Gen. Kirigan
 Kevin Eldon as The Apparat, the spiritual advisor to the King of Ravka
 Jasmine Blackborow as Marie, an Inferni (fire Summoner), who befriends Alina
 Gabrielle Brooks (season 1) and Joanna McGibbon (season 2) as Nadia, a Squaller, who also befriends Alina
 Luke Pasqualino as David Kostyk, a Durast, he crafts weapons and other gadgets for the Grisha

Episodes

Season 1 (2021)

Season 2 (2023)

Production

Development
In January 2019, it was announced that Netflix had given the production a series order for an eight-episode first season with Eric Heisserer as showrunner, creator, head-writer, and executive producer. The project falls under Netflix's deal with 21 Laps Entertainment with Shawn Levy executive producing. Leigh Bardugo, Pouya Shahbazian, Dan Levine, Dan Cohen, and Josh Barry acted as the executive producers as well. On October 2, 2019, Lee Toland Krieger was announced as the director of the pilot.

In June 2021, the series was renewed for an 8-episode second season. It was confirmed in January 2022 that production on the second season had begun. In December 2022, it was reported that the second season will not only cover Siege and Storm, but also Ruin and Rising of Leigh Bardugo's main Grishaverse trilogy.

Language
In a panel discussion led by Petra Mayer, NPR books editor, Leigh Bardugo disclosed to  San Diego Comic-Con 2019 that David J. Peterson would be working on the Grishaverse's fictional languages. Christian Thalmann is also involved in this effort.

Casting
Casting began in April 2019 with calls for Alina. On October 2, 2019, it was announced that Jessie Mei Li, Ben Barnes, Freddy Carter, Archie Renaux, Amita Suman, and Kit Young would be starring. Sujaya Dasgupta, Danielle Galligan, Daisy Head, and Simon Sears would also feature. The second round of casting was announced on December 18, 2019, with Calahan Skogman, Zoë Wanamaker, Kevin Eldon, Julian Kostov, Luke Pasqualino, Jasmine Blackborow, and Gabrielle Brooks in the recurring cast. Bardugo, the book series' author, was scheduled to cameo as a Materalki Durast in the third episode.

Prominent book characters Nikolai Lantsov and Wylan Van Eck did not appear in the first season, but will be introduced in the second. On January 13, 2022, Lewis Tan, Patrick Gibson, Anna Leong Brophy and Jack Wolfe officially joined the cast for the second season while Daisy Head, Danielle Galligan, and Calahan Skogman were promoted to series regulars. More new cast members were confirmed in November 2022, including Tommy Rodger, Rhoda Ofori-Attah, Alistair Nwachukwu, Tumi Fani-Kayode, and Seamus O'Hara.

Filming and locations

Principal photography for the first season began on location in and around Budapest and Keszthely, Hungary in October 2019 and wrapped at the end of February 2020. Additional shoots took place in Vancouver in September 2020.

Shadow and Bone'''s Ketterdam set was built at Origo Studios. Other Budapest filming locations included the Ethnographic Museum (Grand Palace throne room); Buda Castle (Royal Archives exterior) and its medieval rondella (Grisha training grounds and Os Alta gates); the old Stock Exchange (Royal Archives interior); and the main square (Novokribirsk).

Outside of Budapest, the exterior, grounds, and interior of Festetics Palace were used to create the Little Palace, and the winter fete took place in its concert hall. Other locations included the Amadé–Bajzáth–Pappenheim Mansion (Keramzin orphanage); the town of Szentendre (Ryevost) and its open-air museum (Chernast); and the Royal Palace of Gödöllő (stable and chapel). The flashback in which the Darkling creates the Shadow Fold was filmed at the ruined Széchényi–Wenckheim mansion in Békéscsaba.

Filming for the second season began in early January 2022 and wrapped on June 6, 2022.

Post-production
Post-production began after the February 2020 close of shooting. Bardugo reported through Twitter in June 2020 that working remotely in light of COVID-19 had slowed post-production down, rendering the release date less certain. Ted Rae served as VFX supervisor.

Music

Joseph Trapanese is the composer for the series. Heisserer and Bardugo appeared on a panel at New York Comic Con in October 2020, during which they played some of the score. Executive producer Josh Barry reported on December 16, 2020, that the final sound mix was complete.

Trapanese wrote the score over 11 months. In an interview with AwardsDaily.com, he explained how he put it together in lockdown, between conducting an orchestra over Zoom and incorporating solo recordings. Russian and Slavic music provided the basis of the score's inspiration, Bardugo naming Sergei Prokofiev and folk songs as specific examples. In addition, elements from other musical traditions were used, such as gamelan.

Marketing and release
Netflix released a season one announcement teaser in December 2020 followed by promotional stills through Entertainment Weekly as well as main character posters in January 2021. Bardugo, Heisserer, and the six main cast members appeared on a panel at the IGN Fan Fest in February 2021, during which a teaser trailer was released in addition to more stills. Netflix also posted a poster featuring the Shadow Fold the day before. The official season one trailer was released on March 30, 2021, by Netflix, after having been leaked previously.

Bardugo answered in a November 2019 interview with SensaCine that the season one series was expected to air in late 2020. The series was released on April 23, 2021, on Netflix. On April 24, 2021, Netflix released an aftershow for the series on the service, titled Shadow and Bone – The Afterparty. The second season was released on March 16, 2023. The official trailer for the second season was released on February 17, 2023. 

 Reception 
Audience viewership
Netflix revealed alongside the season 2 renewal announcement that 55million households had watched the first season in its first 28 days of availability.

Critical responseShadow and Bone has received positive reviews from critics. For the first season, Rotten Tomatoes reported an approval rating of 89% based on 80 reviews, with an average rating of 7.3/10. The website's critics consensus reads, "From gorgeous costumes to impressive—if intimidating—world-building, Shadow and Bone is certainly as meticulous as its source material, but by folding in unexpected stories it expands the novel's scope to craft an exciting new adventure for fans and newcomers alike." Metacritic gave the first season a weighted average score of 68 out of 100 based on 22 reviews, indicating "generally favorable reviews".

Writing for Empire, Ben Travis gave the first season 3 out of 5 stars, saying, "Shadow And Bone remains compelling while tasking viewers with grasping the Grisha terminology for themselves, showing rather than telling", but noted similarities between the series and Harry Potter, The Hunger Games, and Game of Thrones and described some elements of the series as being "overly confusing". He concluded that "Shadow And Bone will draw you into the Fold with its absorbing world-building and engaging lead duo." Nicole Clark of IGN wrote that "the first season manages to capture much of the darker magic...while being unafraid to make smart changes to certain characters' origin stories and even the sequence of events—even if the storylines from the two series of books don't always easily mesh." Molly Freeman of Screen Rant praised it as a "thrillingly exciting fantasy drama".

Writing for RogerEbert.com, Roxana Hadadi noted the series' use of clichés found in young adult fiction, adding: "Eric Heisserer's adaptation transcends this familiarity thanks to the commitment of a pitch-perfect cast, well-stylized fight sequences, and intentional character development that makes these relationships feel nuanced and history-laden". She concluded: "Altogether, 'Shadow and Bone' maintains a sense of interior place for the characters dealing with plot developments as varied as mean girl dynamics, geopolitical posturing, and body horror, and the well-balanced nature of this first season makes for a promising introduction into this franchise's fantastical universe."

Writing for The Daily Star, Yaameen Al-Muttaqi praised the changes made from the source material, noting that "the years added to each character's age allows the series to explore darker themes, like abuse, corruption, propaganda, manipulation, and human trafficking without breaking audience immersion or pulling punches, as is the case with too many YA adaptations." He was, however, more critical of the omissions made in world building, concluding that "a fair number of things are also left unexplained or unexplored in the series, which may leave viewers who have not read the books, confused." Writing for Tell-Tale TV, Allison Nichols also noted that viewers unfamiliar with the source material may feel isolated when the series "throw[s] them in storylines that seemingly have nothing to do with the main storyline of the show — Alina's journey."

On Rotten Tomatoes, the second season has an 83% approval rating based on 18 reviews, with an average rating of 5.8/10. The website's critics consensus states, "Shadow and Bone'''s sophomore season packs in too much story sinew to properly breathe, but this adventure remains great fun for fantasy fans." On Metacritic, the second season received a score of 73 based on reviews from 7 critics, indicating "generally favorable reviews".

Awards and nominations

References

Further reading

External links 
 
 
 

2020s American drama television series
2020s American mystery television series
2020s American teen drama television series
2021 American television series debuts
American adventure television series
American fantasy drama television series
Dark fantasy television series
English-language Netflix original programming
High fantasy television series
Television about magic
Television series about orphans
Slavic mythology in popular culture
Television series based on American novels
Television shows filmed in Hungary